Etterbeek is one of the 19 municipalities of the Brussels-Capital Region, Belgium. Located in the eastern part of the region, it is bordered by the municipalities of Auderghem, the City of Brussels, Ixelles, Schaerbeek, Woluwe-Saint-Lambert and Woluwe-Saint-Pierre. In common with all of Brussels' municipalities, it is legally bilingual (French–Dutch).

History

Origins and etymology
According to legend, Saint Gertrude of Nivelles, daughter of Pippin of Landen, founded a chapel there in the 8th century. A document by Holy Roman Emperor Otto I, dated 966, mentions the church of Iatrebache. The name Ietrebecca—possibly from the Celtic root ett meaning "rapid movement" and the Dutch word beek meaning "stream"—is found for the first time in a document dated 1127. The current spelling appears eleven years later in 1138, around which time a newer and larger church was built.

Middle Ages

In the Middle Ages, Etterbeek was a rural hamlet mostly independent of Brussels, aside from taxation rights on beer given to Brussels around 1300 by Duke John II of Brabant. The following two centuries counted several grievous moments: in 1489, Duke Albert III of Saxony ravaged Etterbeek in his pursuit of the rebels who fought against Holy Roman Emperor Maximilian; in 1580, the village was destroyed again, this time by iconoclasts during the Protestant Reformation wars. Peace returned under the reigns of the Archdukes Albert VII and Isabella.

Barony and municipality
In 1673, Etterbeek gained its independence from neighbouring Sint-Genesius-Rode, when King Charles II of Spain promoted it into a barony. The first baron was Don Diego-Henriquez de Castro, general treasurer of the Netherlands armies. The Castro house was sold in 1767 and can still be seen today as Etterbeek's oldest building.

Under the French regime, Etterbeek was made into a commune, within the canton of Sint-Stevens-Woluwe. From then on, and especially after the Belgian Revolution of 1830 and the development of Brussels as a capital city, the population of Etterbeek grew quickly. In 1876, there were more than 10,000 inhabitants, in 1900 more than 20,000, and in 1910 more than 33,000. In the 1900s (decade), under the reign of King Leopold II, construction boomed and changed the town's character with the addition of the broad avenues and residential areas that exist today.

Places of interest
 Two Roman Catholic churches are located in Etterbeek: the Church of Saint Anthony of Padua and the Church of Our Lady of the Sacred Heart. A third church—the Church of Saint Gertrude—was demolished in 1993, as it was in danger of collapsing.
 The Cauchie House was built in 1905 by the Art Nouveau architect, painter, and designer Paul Cauchie. Its facade is remarkable for its allegorical sgraffiti.
 Of a completely different character, the Barony House dates from 1680 and is the oldest building in the municipality.
 The Fondation René Carcan, a foundation and museum in the engraver and sculptor René Carcan's old studio, was located in Etterbeek.
 The / has, since 27 September 2014, featured a series of large scale Le Chat drawings by the cartoonist Philippe Geluck, who was born and raised in this neighbourhood.
 Etterbeek has a few green areas, including Jean-Félix Hap Garden. The better known Parc du Cinquantenaire/Jubelpark lies on the territory of both the City of Brussels and Etterbeek, and Leopold Park borders the municipality's territory.

The main university campus of Vrije Universiteit Brussel (VUB) is called Campus Etterbeek, although it is geographically not within Etterbeek but in the adjacent Ixelles.

Transportation
Etterbeek is served by Etterbeek railway station but, like the neighbouring campus of the Vrije Universiteit Brussel (VUB), it is also located in Ixelles. Etterbeek currently has one rail station (Mérode) and three metro stations (Mérode, Thieffry and Pétillon).

Sports
 Etterbeek hosts two football clubs (R.R.C. Etterbeek and Armenia) playing in Belgian Provincial leagues at the Guy Thys Stadium, thus named after the famous Belgian manager since 2003. He led the Belgium national football team to fourth place at the 1986 FIFA World Cup.
 In the summer of 1996, the municipal swimming pool burnt down. It has now been rebuilt and is again open to the public.

Proposed redevelopment "Les Jardins de la Chasse"

A project is currently proposed to redevelop an area of Etterbeek near the /. This project would result in the Municipal Hall and police station being relocated to new buildings in a central administrative centre on this site. The new site is being called the Jardins de la Chasse in French or Tuinen van de Jacht in Dutch. Demolition of the former CPAS building on the site started in 2014, and building of houses on the site started in 2016, with construction of the new Municipal Hall awaiting administrative approval. Municipal offices are forecast to move to the new location in summer 2018. The site of the current Municipal Hall may in the future be used for further residential development.

Events

Etterbeek hosts an annual medieval market. Previously held at the end of May on / to the south of the municipality, in recent years, it has taken place at the Cinquantenaire.

Notable residents

Born in Etterbeek:

 Jérôme d'Ambrosio (b. 1985), racing driver
 Jean Brachet (1909–1998), biochemist
 Monique De Wael a.k.a. Misha Defonseca (b. 1937), writer of Misha: A Mémoire of the Holocaust Years
 Pierre Deligne (b. 1944), Fields Medal-winning mathematician
 François Englert (b. 1932), Nobel Prize–winning physicist
 Giani Esposito (1930–1974), actor
 Lara Fabian (b. 1970), international singer
 Philippe Francq (b. 1961), comic book artist
 André Franquin (1924–1997), cartoonist, creator of Gaston and Marsupilami
 Philippe Geluck (b. 1954), comics writer and artist, creator of Le Chat
 Georges Grün (b. 1962), football defender
 Georges Remi a.k.a. Hergé (1907–1983), comics writer and artist, creator of The Adventures of Tintin
 Arthur Maurice Hocart (1883–1939), anthropologist
 Daniel Hulet (1942–2011), cartoonist
 René Kalisky (1936–1981), playwright, novelist, essayist, journalist, historian
 Roland Lethem (b. 1942), filmmaker and writer
 Alexandre de Merode (1934–2002), member of the International Olympic Committee (IOC)
 Constantin Meunier (1831–1905), painter and sculptor
 Eliane Morissens (1927-2006), LGBT activist known for protests on employment discrimination
 Amélie Nothomb (b. 1966), writer
 Charles Picqué (b. 1948), politician, freemason, and mayor of Saint-Gilles
 Godelieve Quisthoudt-Rowohl (b. 1947), German politician
 Richard Makela a.k.a. Monsieur R (b. 1975), rap artist
 Fabrice Mvemba (b. 1980), retired footballer
 Andre Sapir (b. 1950), economist
 Stromae (b. 1985), singer
 Herman Van Rompuy (b. 1947), politician and first permanent President of the European Council
 Marouane Fellaini (b. 1987), footballer

Lived part of their life in Etterbeek:
 Jean Absil (1893–1974), composer and organist
 Jean-Baptiste Baronian (b. 1942), Belgian-Armenian writer
 René Carcan (1925–1993), engraver and sculptor
 Adrien de Gerlache (1866–1934), officer of the Belgian Navy and leader of the Belgian Antarctic Expedition
 W.F. Hermans (1921–1995), Dutch writer
 Edgar Pierre Jacobs (1904–1987), comic book artist, creator of Blake and Mortimer
 Gaston Salmon (1878–1917), épée fencer, Olympic champion

Buried in Etterbeek:
 Moise Tshombe (1919–1969), Congolese politician

International relations

Twin towns and sister cities
Etterbeek is twinned with:
  Fontenay-sous-Bois, France
  Forte dei Marmi, Italy
  Beauport, Quebec, Canada
  Essaouira, Morocco

References

External links 

 Official website of Etterbeek, in French and Dutch

 
Municipalities of the Brussels-Capital Region
Populated places in Belgium